The following is a list of programs broadcast by UPN. Some programs were carried over to The CW, a network formed through a partnership between WB parent company Time Warner and UPN corporate parent CBS Corporation, in September 2006 following the closure of The WB. Titles are listed in alphabetical order followed by the year of debut in parentheses.

Dramas

Comedies

Adult Animation
Dilbert (1999–00)
Game Over (2004)
Gary & Mike (2001)
Home Movies (1999; moved to Adult Swim)

Reality/other

Children's programming

See also
 List of programs broadcast by The CW

References 

 
UPN